The Samaná Norte is a river in Antioquia Department, Colombia and a tributary of the Magdalena River.

References

Rivers of Colombia
Geography of Antioquia Department